Pleurogenidae is a family of trematodes belonging to the order Plagiorchiida.

Genera:
 Cortrema Tang, 1951
 Langeronia Caballero & Bravo-Hollis, 1949
 Nenimandijea Kaw, 1950
 Pleurogenes Looss, 1896
 Pleurogenoides Travassos, 1921
 Pseudosonsinotrema Dollfus, 1951
 Sinineobucephalopsis Zhang, Pan & Li, 1987
 Sinogastromyzontrema
 Urotrema Braun, 1900
 Urotrematulum Macy, 1933

References

Plagiorchiida